Baccealia is a commune in Căușeni District, Moldova. It is composed of four villages, Baccealia, Florica, Plop and Tricolici. Florica and Plop were moved in subordination to this communes on 12 April 2011; previously they were part of commune of Coșcalia.

References

Communes of Căușeni District